Off to the Races is an album by American trumpeter Donald Byrd recorded in 1958 and released on the Blue Note label in 1959 as BLP 4007.

Reception
The Allmusic review by Stephen Thomas Erlewine awarded the album 4 stars and stated "There's nothing surprising about Off to the Races; it's simply a set of well-performed, enjoyable hard bop, but sometimes that's enough".

Track listing
All compositions by Donald Byrd except as indicated.

 "Lover, Come Back to Me" (Oscar Hammerstein II, Sigmund Romberg) - 6:52
 "When Your Lover Has Gone" (Einar Aaron Swan) - 5:04
 "Sudwest Funk" - 6:53
 "Paul's Pal" (Sonny Rollins) - 7:08
 "Off to the Races" - 6:36
 "Down Tempo" - 5:19

Personnel
Donald Byrd - trumpet,
Jackie McLean - alto saxophone (tracks 1 & 3-6)
Pepper Adams - baritone saxophone (tracks 1 & 3-6)
Wynton Kelly - piano
Sam Jones - bass
Art Taylor - drums

References

1959 albums
Albums produced by Alfred Lion
Albums recorded at Van Gelder Studio
Blue Note Records albums
Donald Byrd albums